Liechtenstein, officially the Principality of Liechtenstein, is a German-speaking microstate located in the Alps between Austria and Switzerland. It is the sixth smallest nation worldwide.
Liechtenstein is a semi-constitutional monarchy headed by the prince of Liechtenstein.

Liechtenstein is bordered by Switzerland to the west and south and Austria to the east and north. Divided into 11 municipalities, its capital is Vaduz, and its largest municipality is Schaan. It is also the smallest country to border two countries. Liechtenstein is a doubly landlocked country between Switzerland and Austria.

Economically, Liechtenstein has one of the highest gross domestic products per person in the world when adjusted for purchasing power parity. The country has a strong financial sector centred in Vaduz. It was once known as a billionaire tax haven, but is no longer on any official blacklists of uncooperative tax haven countries. An Alpine country, Liechtenstein is mountainous, making it a winter sport destination.

Liechtenstein is a member of the United Nations, the European Free Trade Association, and the Council of Europe. Although not a member of the European Union because it was not designed with microstates in mind, it participates in both the Schengen Area and the European Economic Area. It has a customs union and a monetary union with Switzerland.

History

Early history 

The oldest traces of human existence in the area of present-day Liechtenstein date back to the Middle Paleolithic era. Neolithic farming settlements appeared in the valleys around 5300 BC.

The Hallstatt and La Tène cultures flourished during the late Iron Age, from around 450 BCE—possibly under some influence of both the Greek and Etruscan civilisations. One of the most important tribal groups in the Alpine region were the Helvetii. In 58 BCE, at the Battle of Bibracte, Julius Caesar defeated the Alpine tribes, thereby bringing the region under Roman subjugation. By 15 BCE, Tiberius—later the second Roman emperor—with his brother, Drusus, conquered the entire Alpine area. Liechtenstein then became integrated into the Roman province of Raetia. The area was garrisoned by the Roman army, which maintained large legionary camps at Brigantium (Austria), near Lake Constance, and at Magia (Switzerland). The Romans built and maintained a road which ran through the territory. Around 260 CE Brigantium was destroyed by the Alemanni, a Germanic people who later settled in the area around 450.

In the Early Middle Ages, the Alemanni settled the eastern Swiss plateau by the 5th century and the valleys of the Alps by the end of the 8th century, with Liechtenstein located at the eastern edge of Alamannia. In the 6th century the entire region became part of the Frankish Empire following Clovis I's victory over the Alemanni at Tolbiac in 504.

The area that later became Liechtenstein remained under Frankish hegemony (Merovingian and Carolingian dynasties) until the Treaty of Verdun divided the Carolingian empire in 843, following the death of Charlemagne in 814. The territory of present-day Liechtenstein formed part of East Francia. It would later be reunified with Middle Francia under the Holy Roman Empire, around 1000. Until about 1100, the predominant language of the area was Romansch, but thereafter German began to gain ground in the territory. In 1300 another Alemannic population—the Walsers, who originated in Valais—entered the region and settled; the mountain village of Triesenberg today preserves features of the Walser dialect.

Foundation of a dynasty 
By 1200, dominions across the Alpine plateau were controlled by the Houses of Savoy, Zähringer, Habsburg, and Kyburg. Other regions were accorded the Imperial immediacy that granted the empire direct control over the mountain passes. When the Kyburg dynasty fell in 1264, the Habsburgs under King Rudolph I (Holy Roman Emperor in 1273) extended their territory to the eastern Alpine plateau that included the territory of Liechtenstein. This region was enfeoffed to the Counts of Hohenems until the sale to the Liechtenstein dynasty in 1699.

In 1396 Vaduz (the southern region of Liechtenstein) gained imperial immediacy, i.e. it became subject to the Holy Roman Emperor alone.

The family from which the principality takes its name originally came from Liechtenstein Castle in Lower Austria, which they had possessed from at least 1140 until the 13th century (and again from 1807 onwards). The Liechtensteins acquired land, predominantly in Moravia, Lower Austria, Silesia, and Styria. Even though several Liechtenstein princes served several Habsburg rulers as close advisers, without any territory held directly from the Imperial throne, they held little power in the Holy Roman Empire.

Hans-Adam I was allowed to purchase the minuscule  ('Lordship') of Schellenberg and the county of Vaduz (in 1699 and 1712 respectively) from the Hohenems. Tiny Schellenberg and Vaduz had exactly the political status required: no feudal lord other than their comital sovereign and the suzerain Emperor.

Principality 

On this date, Liechtenstein became a sovereign member state of the Holy Roman Empire.

By the early 19th century, as a result of the Napoleonic Wars in Europe, the Holy Roman Empire came under the effective control of France, following the crushing defeat at Austerlitz by Napoleon in 1805. In 1806 Emperor Francis II abdicated and dissolved the Holy Roman Empire, ending more than 960 years of feudal government. Napoleon reorganized much of the Empire into the Confederation of the Rhine. This political restructuring had broad consequences for Liechtenstein: the historical imperial, legal, and political institutions had been dissolved. The state ceased to owe an obligation to any feudal lord beyond its borders.

Modern publications generally attribute Liechtenstein's sovereignty to these events. Its prince ceased to owe an obligation to any suzerain. From 25 July 1806, when the Confederation of the Rhine was founded, the Prince of Liechtenstein was a member, in fact, a vassal, of its hegemon, styled protector, the French Emperor Napoleon I, until the dissolution of the confederation on 19 October 1813.

Soon afterward, Liechtenstein joined the German Confederation (20 June 181523 August 1866), which was presided over by the Emperor of Austria.

In 1818, Prince Johann I granted the territory a limited constitution. In that same year Prince Aloys became the first member of the House of Liechtenstein to set foot in the principality that bore their name. The next visit would not occur until 1842.

Developments during the 19th century included:
 1836: the first factory for making ceramics was opened.
 1861: the Savings and Loans Bank was founded along with the first cotton-weaving mill.
 1866: the German Confederation was dissolved.
 1868: the Liechtenstein Army was disbanded for financial reasons.
 1872: a railway line between Switzerland and the Austro-Hungarian Empire was constructed through Liechtenstein.
 1886: two bridges over the Rhine to Switzerland were built.

20th century 
Until the end of World War I, Liechtenstein was closely tied first to the Austrian Empire and later to Austria-Hungary; the ruling princes continued to derive much of their wealth from estates in the Habsburg territories, and spent much of their time at their two palaces in Vienna. Johann II appointed Carl von In der Maur, an Austrian aristocrat, to serve as the Governor of Liechtenstein. The economic devastation caused by World War I forced the country to conclude a customs and monetary union with its other neighbour Switzerland.

In 1929, 75-year-old Prince Franz I succeeded to the throne. He had just married Elisabeth von Gutmann, a wealthy woman from Vienna whose father was a Jewish businessman from Moravia. Although Liechtenstein had no official Nazi party, a Nazi sympathy movement arose within its National Union party. Local Liechtenstein Nazis identified Elisabeth as their Jewish "problem".

In March 1938, just after the annexation of Austria by Nazi Germany, Franz named as regent his 31-year-old grandnephew and heir-presumptive, Prince Franz Joseph. Franz died in July that year, and Franz Joseph succeeded to the throne. Franz Joseph II moved to Liechtenstein in 1938, a few days after Austria's annexation.

During World War II, Liechtenstein remained officially neutral, looking to neighbouring Switzerland for assistance and guidance, while family treasures from dynastic lands and possessions in Bohemia, Moravia, and Silesia were taken to Liechtenstein for safekeeping. At the close of the conflict, Czechoslovakia and Poland, acting to seize what they considered German possessions, expropriated all of the Liechtenstein dynasty's properties in those three regions.

In 2005 it was revealed that Jewish slave labourers from the Strasshof concentration camp, provided by the SS, had worked on estates in Austria owned by Liechtenstein's Princely House.

Citizens of Liechtenstein were forbidden to enter Czechoslovakia during the Cold War. The diplomatic conflict revolving around the controversial postwar Beneš decrees resulted in Liechtenstein not having international relations with the Czech Republic or Slovakia. Diplomatic relations were established between Liechtenstein and the Czech Republic on 13 July 2009, and with Slovakia on 9 December 2009.

On 20 September 1990, Liechtenstein was admitted into the United Nations as 160th member state. As a member of the United Nations General Assembly, the microstate is one of the few not to play a prominent role in fewer UN-specialized agencies.

Financial centre 
Liechtenstein was in dire financial straits following the end of World War II. The Liechtenstein dynasty often resorted to selling family artistic treasures, including the portrait Ginevra de' Benci by Leonardo da Vinci, which was purchased by the National Gallery of Art of the United States in 1967 for 5 million ($ million in  dollars), then a record price for a painting.

By the late 1970s, Liechtenstein used its low corporate tax rates to draw many companies and became one of the wealthiest countries in the world.

Liechtenstein is one of the few countries in Europe (along with Monaco and San Marino) not to have a tax treaty with the United States, and efforts toward one seem to have stalled.

 the Prince of Liechtenstein is the world's sixth wealthiest monarch, with an estimated wealth of 3.5 billion. The country's population enjoys one of the world's highest standards of living.

Government 

Liechtenstein has a monarch as head of state, and an elected parliament that enacts the law. It is a direct democracy, where voters can propose and enact constitutional amendments and legislation independently of the legislature. The Constitution of Liechtenstein was adopted in March 2003, replacing the 1921 constitution. The 1921 constitution had established Liechtenstein as a constitutional monarchy headed by the reigning prince of the Princely House of Liechtenstein; a parliamentary system had been established, although the reigning Prince retained substantial political authority.

The reigning Prince is the Head of State and represents Liechtenstein in its international relations (although Switzerland has taken responsibility for much of Liechtenstein's diplomatic relations). The Prince may veto laws adopted by parliament. The Prince may call referendums, propose new legislation, and dissolve parliament, although dissolution of parliament may be subject to a referendum.

Executive authority is vested in a collegiate government comprising the head of government (prime minister) and four government councillors (ministers). The head of government and the other ministers are appointed by the Prince upon the proposal of parliament and with its concurrence, and reflect the balance of parties in parliament. The constitution stipulates that at least two government members be chosen from each of the two regions. The members of the government are collectively and individually responsible to parliament; parliament may ask the Prince to remove an individual minister or the entire government.

Legislative authority is vested in the unicameral Landtag, made up of 25 members elected for maximum four-year terms according to a proportional representation formula. Fifteen members are elected from the Oberland (Upper Country or region) and ten from the Unterland (Lower Country or region). Parties must receive at least 8% of the national vote to win seats in parliament, i.e., enough for two seats in the 25-seat legislature. Parliament proposes and approves a government, which the Prince formally appoints. Parliament may also pass votes of no confidence in the entire government or individual members.

Parliament elects from among its members a "Landesausschuss" (National Committee) made up of the president of the parliament and four additional members. The National Committee is charged with performing functions of parliamentary supervision. Parliament can call for referendums on proposed legislation. Parliament shares the authority to propose new legislation with the Prince and with the number of citizens required for to initiate a referendum.

Judicial authority is vested in the Regional Court at Vaduz, the Princely High Court of Appeal at Vaduz, the Princely Supreme Court, the Administrative Court, and the State Court. The State Court rules on the conformity of laws with the constitution and has five members elected by parliament.

On 1 July 1984, Liechtenstein became the last country in Europe to grant women the right to vote. The referendum on women's suffrage, in which only men were allowed to participate, passed with 51.3% in favour.

Current constitution 
In a national referendum in March 2003, nearly two-thirds of the electorate voted in support of Hans-Adam II's proposed new constitution. The proposed constitution was criticised by many, including the Council of Europe, as expanding the powers of the monarchy (continuing the power to veto any law, and allowing the Prince to dismiss the government or any minister). The Prince threatened that if the constitution failed, he would, among other things, convert some royal property for commercial use and move to Austria. The princely family and the Prince enjoy tremendous public support inside the nation, and the resolution passed with about 64% in favour. A proposal to revoke the Prince's veto powers was rejected by 76% of voters in a 2012 referendum.

Municipalities 
Municipalities of Liechtenstein are entitled to secede from the union by majority vote.

The municipalities of Liechtenstein are divided between the two electoral districts of Unterland and Oberland. The country's political division is historical; the Unterland depends on Schellenberg, the Oberland on the county of Vaduz.

The northern communities of Eschen, Gamprin, Mauren, Ruggell and Schellenberg belong to Unterland; the municipalities of Balzers, Planken, Schaan, Triesen, Triesenberg and Vaduz belong to the much larger Oberland. The autonomy of the Liechtenstein communities is in the upper range compared to the other Central European states along with Switzerland. Despite their small size, the municipalities have complex forms in terms of their territorial extent: in addition to a main part, seven municipalities also include one or more exclaves. Citizens' cooperatives, which exist in about half of Liechtenstein's municipalities, own forests and pastures for collective use, as well as parceled areas that are left for private use.

International awards 
In 2013, Liechtenstein won for the first time a SolarSuperState Prize in the Solar category recognizing the achieved level of the usage of photovoltaics per population within the state territory. The SolarSuperState Association justified this prize with the cumulative installed photovoltaic power of some 290 watts per capita at the end of 2012. This placed Liechtenstein second in the world after Germany. Also in 2014, the SolarSuperState Association awarded the second place SolarSuperState Prize in the Solar category to Liechtenstein. In the years 2015 and 2016, Liechtenstein was honoured with the first place SolarSuperState Prize in the Solar category because it had the world's biggest cumulative installed photovoltaic power output per capita.

Foreign relations 
In the absence of political or military power, Liechtenstein has sought to preserve its sovereignty over the past 200 years through membership in legal communities. International cooperation and European integration are therefore constants of Liechtenstein's foreign policy, aimed at continuing to safeguard the country's sovereignty as recognized under international law. Decisive for the domestic legitimacy and sustainability of this foreign policy were and are strong direct-democratic and citizen-oriented decision-making mechanisms, which are anchored in Liechtenstein in the Constitution of 1921.

Important historical stages in Liechtenstein's integration and cooperation policy were its accession to the Confederation of the Rhine in 1806, to the German Confederation in 1815, the conclusion of bilateral customs and currency agreements with the Danube Monarchy in 1852, and finally the Customs Treaty with Switzerland in 1923, which was followed by a whole series of other important bilateral treaties.

Post-war economic reconstruction was followed by accession to the Statute of the International Court of Justice in 1950, Liechtenstein signed the CSCE Helsinki Final Act (today's OSCE) together with 34 other states in 1975, Liechtenstein joined the Council of Europe in 1978, and Liechtenstein was admitted to the United Nations (UN) on September 18, 1990. In 1991, Liechtenstein joined the European Free Trade Association (EFTA) as a full member, and since 1995 Liechtenstein has been a member of the European Economic Area (EEA) and the World Trade Organization (WTO). In 2008, Liechtenstein joined the Schengen/Dublin Agreement together with Switzerland. From an economic and integration policy perspective, relations within the framework of the EEA and the EU occupy a special position in Liechtenstein's foreign policy. The Hereditary Prince of Liechtenstein also participates in the annual meetings of the heads of state of the German-speaking countries (consisting of EU and non-EU members).

Relations with Switzerland are particularly extensive because of the close cooperation in many areas; Switzerland performs tasks in some places that would be difficult for the Principality to handle on its own because of its small size. Since 2000, Switzerland has appointed an ambassador to Liechtenstein, but he resides in Bern. Liechtenstein's consular representation has been mostly handled by Switzerland since the Customs Treaty with Switzerland of 1923.

Liechtenstein maintains direct diplomatic missions in Vienna, Bern, Berlin, Brussels, Strasbourg, and Washington, D.C., as well as Permanent Missions in New York and Geneva to the United Nations. Currently, diplomatic missions from 78 countries are accredited to Liechtenstein, but mostly reside in Bern. The Embassy in Brussels coordinates contacts with the European Union, Belgium, and also the Holy See.

For a long time, diplomatic relations with Germany were maintained through a non-resident ambassador; that is, a contact person who was not permanently resident in Germany. Since 2002, however, Liechtenstein has had a permanent ambassador in Berlin, while the German embassy in Switzerland is also responsible for the Principality. Liechtenstein's Ministry of Foreign Affairs considers the contacts to be extremely fruitful and important for the country's development, especially on the economic level.

Conflicts over the handling of banking and tax data have repeatedly strained relations with Germany. On September 2, 2009, Liechtenstein and Germany signed an agreement on cooperation and the exchange of information in tax matters. The text of the agreement followed the OECD model agreement and provides for an exchange of information on tax matters upon request as of the 2010 tax year. In addition, Liechtenstein regards Germany as an important partner in safeguarding its interests in European integration. At the cultural level, project sponsorship plays a particularly important role. For example, the Hilti Foundation financed the exhibition "Egypt's Sunken Treasures" in Berlin, and the state donated 20,000 euros following the fire at the Duchess Anna Amalia Library in Weimar.

Geography 

Liechtenstein is situated in the Upper Rhine valley of the European Alps and is bordered to the east by the Austrian state of Vorarlberg, to the south by the canton of Grisons (Switzerland) and to the west by the canton of St. Gallen (Switzerland). The Rhine forms the entire western border of Liechtenstein. Despite its Alpine location, prevailing southerly winds make the climate comparatively mild. In winter, the mountain slopes are well suited to winter sports.

Liechtenstein's borders are  longer than previously thought.

Liechtenstein is one of the world's two doubly landlocked countries – countries wholly surrounded by other landlocked countries (the other is Uzbekistan). Liechtenstein is the sixth-smallest independent nation in the world by area.

The principality of Liechtenstein is divided into 11 communes called Gemeinden (singular Gemeinde). The Gemeinden mostly consist of only a single town or village. Five of them (Eschen, Gamprin, Mauren, Ruggell, and Schellenberg) fall within the electoral district Unterland (the lower county), and the remainder (Balzers, Planken, Schaan, Triesen, Triesenberg, and Vaduz) within Oberland (the upper county).

Climate 

Despite its alpine location, the prevailing southerly winds temper Liechtenstein's climate. Its climate is continental, with cloudy and cold winters, with frequent rain and snowfall. Summers are cool to slightly warm, cloudy, and humid.

The country's climate is relatively mild despite its mountainous location. It is strongly influenced by the action of foehn (warm and dry autumn wind), so the vegetation period is prolonged in spring and autumn and temperatures around  due to the strong foehn are not uncommon even in winter. The mountain ranges of Switzerland and the Vorarlberg upstream protect from the cold polar and Atlantic air, creating a typical alpine inland protective layer. The principality has orchards with leafy meadows and a long tradition of viticulture. Liechtenstein's small land area hardly plays a role in climatic differences, but the vertical division into different altitudes is of great importance, so that significant climatic differences arise.

The average duration of sunshine is about 1600 hours per year.

Rivers and lakes 
The Rhine is the longest and largest body of water in Liechtenstein. Furthermore, the Rhine is an important recreational area for the population. At , the Samina is the second longest river in the Principality. The troubled river begins at Triesenberg and flows into the Ill in Austria (near Feldkirch).

The only naturally formed lake in Liechtenstein is the Gampriner Seelein, which was not formed until 1927 by a flooding of the Rhine with enormous erosion. In addition, there are other artificially created lakes, which are mainly used to generate electricity. One of them is the Steg Reservoir, the largest lake in Liechtenstein.

Mountains 
About half of Liechtenstein's territory is mountainous. Liechtenstein lies entirely in the Rhaetikon and is thus – depending on the classification of the Alps – assigned either to the Eastern Alps (two-part division of the Alps) or to the Central Alps (three-part division of the Alps).

In total, there are 32 mountains in Liechtenstein with an altitude of at least . The Liechtenstein-Graubünden-Vorarlberg border triangle is the Naafkopf ( above sea level).

In addition to the peaks of the Alpine chain, which belong to the Limestone Alps, two inselbergs, Fläscherberg ( above sea level) in the south and Eschnerberg in the north, rise from the Rhine Valley and belong to the Helvetic cover or flysch zone of the Alps. Eschnerberg represents an important settlement area in the Liechtenstein Unterland.

Economy 

Despite its limited natural resources, Liechtenstein is one of the few countries in the world with more registered companies than citizens; it has developed a prosperous, highly industrialized free-enterprise economy and boasts a financial service sector as well as a living standard that compares favourably with those of the urban areas of Liechtenstein's much larger European neighbours.

Liechtenstein participates in a customs union with Switzerland and employs the Swiss franc as the national currency. The country imports about 85% of its energy. Liechtenstein has been a member of the European Economic Area (an organization serving as a bridge between the European Free Trade Association (EFTA) and the European Union) since May 1995.

The government is working to harmonize its economic policies with those of an integrated Europe. In 2008, the unemployment rate stood at 1.5%. Liechtenstein has only one hospital, the Liechtensteinisches Landesspital in Vaduz. As of 2014 the CIA World Factbook estimated the gross domestic product (GDP) on a purchasing power parity basis to be $4.978 billion. As of 2009 the estimate per capita was $139,100, the highest listed for the world.

Industries include electronics, textiles, precision instruments, metal manufacturing, power tools, anchor bolts, calculators, pharmaceuticals and food products. Its most recognizable international company and largest employer is Hilti, a manufacturer of direct fastening systems and other high-end power tools. Many cultivated fields and small farms are found both in the Oberland and Unterland. Liechtenstein produces wheat, barley, corn, potatoes, dairy products, livestock and wine.

Taxation 

The government of Liechtenstein taxes personal income, business income and principal (wealth). The basic rate of personal income tax is 1.2%. When combined with the additional income tax imposed by the communes, the combined income tax rate is 17.82%. An additional income tax of 4.3% is levied on all employees under the country's social security programme. This rate is higher for the self-employed, up to a maximum of 11%, making the maximum income tax rate about 29% in total. The basic tax rate on wealth is 0.06% per annum, and the combined total rate is 0.89%. The tax rate on corporate profits is 12.5%.

Liechtenstein's gift and estate taxes vary depending on the relationship the recipient has to the giver and the amount of the inheritance. The tax ranges between 0.5% and 0.75% for spouses and children and 18% to 27% for non-related recipients. The estate tax is progressive.

Liechtenstein has previously received significant revenues from Stiftungen ("foundations"), financial entities created to hide the true owner of nonresident foreigners' financial holdings. The foundation is registered in the name of a Liechtensteiner, often a lawyer. This set of laws used to make Liechtenstein a popular tax haven for extremely wealthy individuals and businesses attempting to avoid or evade taxes in their home countries. In recent years, Liechtenstein has displayed stronger determination to prosecute international money launderers and worked to promote an image as a legitimate finance centre. In February 2008, the country's LGT Bank was implicated in a tax-fraud scandal in Germany, which strained the ruling family's relationship with the German government. Crown Prince Alois has accused the German government of trafficking in stolen goods, referring to its $7.3 million purchase of private banking information offered by a former employee of LGT Group. The United States Senate's subcommittee on tax haven banks said that the LGT bank, owned by the princely family, and on whose board they serve, "is a willing partner, and an aider and abettor to clients trying to evade taxes, dodge creditors or defy court orders".

The 2008 Liechtenstein tax affair is a series of tax investigations in numerous countries whose governments suspect that some of their citizens have evaded tax obligations by using banks and trusts in Liechtenstein; the affair broke open with the biggest complex of investigations ever initiated for tax evasion in Germany. It was also seen as an attempt to put pressure on Liechtenstein, then one of the remaining uncooperative tax havens—along with Andorra and Monaco—as identified by the Paris-based Organisation for Economic Co-operation and Development in 2007. On 27 May 2009 the OECD removed Liechtenstein from the blacklist of uncooperative countries.

In August 2009, the British government department HM Revenue & Customs agreed with Liechtenstein to start exchanging information. It is believed that up to 5,000 British investors have roughly £3 billion deposited in accounts and trusts in the country.

In October 2015, the European Union and Liechtenstein signed a tax agreement to ensure the automatic exchange of financial information in case of tax disputes. The collection of data started in 2016. It is another step to bring the principality in line with other European countries regarding its taxation of private individuals and corporate assets.

Tourism 
Tourism accounts for a large portion of Liechtenstein's economy.

Airbnb once offered to rent space for 450–900 guests in Liechtenstein for about US$70,000 per night.

Demographics 

With a population of 39,315 as of 31 December 2021, Liechtenstein is Europe's fourth-smallest country; Vatican City, San Marino, and Monaco have fewer residents. Its population is primarily Alemannic-speaking, although one third is foreign-born, primarily German speakers from Germany, Austria, and Switzerland, along with other Swiss, Italians, and Turks. Foreign-born people make up two-thirds of the country's workforce.

Liechtensteiners have an average life expectancy at birth of 82.0 years, subdividing as male: 79.8 years, female: 84.8 years (2018 est.). The infant mortality rate is 4.2 deaths per 1,000 live births, according to 2018 estimates.

Languages 
The official language is German, spoken by 92% of the population as their main language in 2020. 73% of Liechtenstein's population speak an Alemannic dialect of German at home that is highly divergent from Standard German but closely related to dialects spoken in neighbouring regions such as Switzerland and Vorarlberg, Austria. In Triesenberg, a Walser German dialect promoted by the municipality is spoken. Swiss Standard German is also understood and spoken by most Liechtensteiners.

Religion 

According to the Constitution of Liechtenstein, Catholicism is its official state religion:

Liechtenstein offers protection to adherents of all religions, and considers the "religious interests of the people" a priority of the government. In Liechtenstein's schools, although exceptions are allowed, religious education in Catholicism or Protestantism (either Lutheran or Calvinist, or both) is legally required. Tax exemption is granted by the government to religious organizations. According to the Pew Research Center, social conflict caused by religious hostilities is low in Liechtenstein, and so is government restriction on the practice of religion.

According to the 2010 census, 85.8% of the total population is Christian, of whom 75.9% adhere to the Catholic faith, constituted in the Catholic Archdiocese of Vaduz, while 9.6% are either Protestant, mainly organized in the Evangelical Church in Liechtenstein (a United church, Lutheran & Reformed) and the Evangelical Lutheran Church in Liechtenstein, or Orthodox, mainly organized in the Christian-Orthodox Church. The largest minority religion is Islam (5.4% of the total population).

Education 

The literacy rate of Liechtenstein is 100%. In 2006 Programme for International Student Assessment report, coordinated by the Organisation for Economic Co-operation and Development, ranked Liechtenstein's education as the 10th-best in the world. In 2012, Liechtenstein had the highest PISA scores of any European country.

Within Liechtenstein, there are four main centres for higher education:

University of Liechtenstein
Private University in the Principality of Liechtenstein
Liechtenstein Institute
International Academy of Philosophy, Liechtenstein

There are nine public high schools in the country. These include:

Liechtensteinisches Gymnasium in Vaduz.
Realschule Vaduz and Oberschule Vaduz, in the Schulzentrum Mühleholz II in Vaduz
Realschule Schaan and Sportschule Liechtenstein in Schaan

Transport 

A  railway connects Austria and Switzerland through Liechtenstein. The country's railways are administered by the Austrian Federal Railways as part of the route between Feldkirch, Austria, and Buchs, Switzerland. Liechtenstein is nominally within the Austrian Verkehrsverbund Vorarlberg tariff region.

There are four railway stations in Liechtenstein, namely Schaan-Vaduz, Forst Hilti, Nendeln and Schaanwald, served by an irregularly stopping train service between Feldkirch and Buchs provided by Austrian Federal Railways. While EuroCity and other long-distance international trains also travel along the route, they do not normally stop at the stations within the borders of Liechtenstein.

Liechtenstein Bus is a subsidiary of the Swiss Postbus system, but separately run, and connects to the Swiss bus network at Buchs and at Sargans. Buses also run to the Austrian town of Feldkirch.

Liechtenstein is one of only a few countries without an airport. The nearest large airport is Zurich Airport near Zürich, Switzerland ( by road). The nearest small airport is St. Gallen Airport. Balzers Heliport is available for chartered helicopter flights.

Culture 

As a result of its small size, Liechtenstein has been strongly affected by external cultural influences, most notably those originating in the southern regions of German-speaking Europe, including Austria, Baden-Württemberg, Bavaria, Switzerland, and specifically Tirol and Vorarlberg. The Historical Society of the Principality of Liechtenstein plays a role in preserving the culture and history of the country.

The largest museum is the Kunstmuseum Liechtenstein, an international museum of modern and contemporary art with an important international art collection. The building by the Swiss architects Morger, Degelo, and Kerez is a landmark in Vaduz. It was completed in November 2000 and forms a "black box" of tinted concrete and black basalt stone. The museum collection is also the national art collection of Liechtenstein.

The other important museum is the Liechtenstein National Museum (Liechtensteinisches Landesmuseum) showing permanent exhibitions on the cultural and natural history of Liechtenstein as well as special exhibitions. There is also a stamp museum, ski museum, and a 500-year-old Rural Lifestyle Museum.

The Liechtenstein State Library is the library that has legal deposit for all books published in the country. Poet Ida Ospelt-Amann published her works exclusively in the Alemannic dialect of Vaduz.

The most famous historical sites are Vaduz Castle, Gutenberg Castle, the Red House, and the ruins of Schellenberg.

The Private Art Collection of the Prince of Liechtenstein, one of the world's leading private art collections, is shown at the Liechtenstein Museum in Vienna.

On the country's national holiday, all subjects are invited to the castle of the head of state. A significant portion of the population attends the national celebration at the castle where speeches are made and complimentary beer is served.

Music and theatre are important parts of the culture. There are numerous music organizations such as the Liechtenstein Musical Company, the annual Guitar Days, and the International Josef Gabriel Rheinberger Society, which play in two main theatres.

Media 
The primary internet service provider and mobile network operator of Liechtenstein is Telecom Liechtenstein, located in Schaan.

There are two conventional television channels in the country. The private channel 1FLTV was created in 2008 with a goal of joining the European Broadcasting Union, which it has not accomplished yet. The Landeskanal is operated by the government's Unit for Information and Communication and carries government proceedings, public affairs programming, and cultural events. Both are seen on local cable providers, along with channels from the other German-speaking countries. The only free television is ORF from Austria, available via terrestrial overspill of its signal from Vorarlberg.

Radio Liechtenstein, which was established in 2004 along with the public-service broadcaster Liechtensteinischer Rundfunk (LRF) that operates it, is the country's only domestic radio station based in Triesen. Radio Liechtenstein and several programs of the Swiss SRF are broadcast from the Sender Erbi overlooking Vaduz. Liechtenstein also has two major newspapers: Liechtensteiner Volksblatt and Liechtensteiner Vaterland.

Amateur radio is a hobby of some nationals and visitors. However, unlike virtually every other sovereign nation, Liechtenstein does not have its own ITU prefix. Conventionally, amateurs are issued call signs with the Swiss prefix "HB", followed by "0" or "L".

Sports 

Liechtenstein football teams play in the Swiss football leagues. The Liechtenstein Football Cup allows access for one Liechtenstein team each year to the UEFA Europa Conference League; FC Vaduz, a team playing in the Swiss Challenge League, the second division in Swiss football, is the most successful team in the Cup, and scored their greatest success in the European Cup Winners' Cup in 1996 when they drew with and defeated the Latvian team FC Universitate Riga by 1–1 and 4–2, to go on to a lucrative fixture against Paris Saint-Germain F.C., which they lost 0–3 and 0–4.

The Liechtenstein national football team is regarded as an easy target for any team drawn against them; this was the basis for a book about Liechtenstein's unsuccessful qualifying campaign for the 2002 World Cup by British author Charlie Connelly. In one surprising week during autumn 2004, however, the team managed a 2–2 draw with Portugal, who only a few months earlier had been the losing finalists in the European Championships. Four days later, the Liechtenstein team traveled to Luxembourg, where they defeated the home team 4–0 in a 2006 World Cup qualifying match. In the qualification stage of the European Championship 2008, Liechtenstein beat Latvia 1–0, which prompted the Latvian coach's resignation. They went on to beat Iceland 3–0 on 17 October 2007, which is considered one of the most dramatic losses of the Icelandic national football team. On 7 September 2010, they came within seconds of a 1–1 draw against Scotland in Glasgow, having led 1–0 earlier in the second half, but Liechtenstein lost 2–1 thanks to a goal by Stephen McManus in the 97th minute. On 3 June 2011, Liechtenstein defeated Lithuania 2–0. On 15 November 2014, Liechtenstein defeated Moldova 0–1 with Franz Burgmeier's late free kick goal in Chișinău.

As an alpine country, the main sporting opportunity for Liechtensteiners to excel is in winter sports such as downhill skiing: the country's single ski area is Malbun. Hanni Wenzel won two gold medals and one silver medal in the 1980 Winter Olympics (she won bronze in 1976), her brother Andreas won one silver medal in 1980 and one bronze medal in 1984 in the giant slalom event, and her daughter Tina Weirather won a bronze medal in 2018 in the Super-G. With ten medals overall (all in alpine skiing), Liechtenstein has won more Olympic medals per capita than any other nation. It is the smallest nation to win a medal in any Olympics, Winter or Summer, and currently the only nation to win a medal in the Winter Games but not in the Summer Games. Other notable skiers from Liechtenstein are Marco Büchel, Willi Frommelt, Paul Frommelt and Ursula Konzett.

Another discipline unusually popular with Liechtensteiners is motorsport – American-born German-Colombian Rikky von Opel raced under the flag of Liechtenstein in Formula One in 1973 and 1974, and Manfred Schurti competed in 9 editions of the 24 Hours of Le Mans as a Porsche factory driver with a best finish of 4th overall in 1976. The nation is currently represented internationally by Fabienne Wohlwend and Matthias Kaiser in endurance racing.

Other sports Liechtenstein athletes have had success in include tennis, with Stephanie Vogt and Kathinka von Deichmann both having varying degrees of success on the women's tour, as well as swimming – both Julia Hassler and Christoph Meier represented the country at the 2016 Summer Olympics with the former the nations' flag bearer.

In March 2020, the distance world record for electric motorcycles was set in Liechtenstein. Artist Michel von Tell drove over 1000 Miles within 24 hours on the first electric Harley-Davidson. The Record is still current in 2023 and ended in Ruggell. The Event became global media attention.

Youth 
Liechtenstein competes in the Switzerland U16 Cup Tournament, which offers young players an opportunity to play against top football clubs.

Security and defence 

The Liechtenstein National Police is responsible for keeping order within the country. It consists of 87 field officers and 38 civilian staff, totaling 125 employees. All officers are equipped with small arms. The country has one of the world's lowest crime rates. Liechtenstein's prison holds few, if any, inmates, and those with sentences over two years are transferred to Austrian jurisdiction. The Liechtenstein National Police maintains a trilateral treaty with Austria and Switzerland that enables close cross-border cooperation among the police forces of the three countries.

Liechtenstein follows a policy of neutrality and is one of the few countries in the world that maintain no military although its police force maintains a paramilitary force, the Princely Liechtenstein Security Corps, within the organisation that would act as its de facto army if an invasion of Liechtenstein ever occurred. The Princely Liechtenstein Security Corps provides heavy backup for the National Police as well as Honor Guards at the Royal Palace and official functions. However, Liechtenstein can reinstate its military if deemed necessary, although this is very unlikely.

The army was abolished for financial reasons soon after the Austro-Prussian War of 1866, in which Liechtenstein fielded an army of 80 men, although they were not involved in any fighting. No casualties were incurred; in fact, the unit numbered 81 upon return due to an Italian military liaison who accompanied the army back home. The demise of the German Confederation in that war freed Liechtenstein from its international obligation to maintain an army, and parliament seized this opportunity and refused to provide funding for one. The Prince objected, as such a move would leave the country defenceless, but relented on 12 February 1868 and disbanded the force. The last soldier to serve under the colours of Liechtenstein died in 1939 at age 95.

 In 1985 the Swiss Army fired off shells during an exercise and mistakenly burned a patch of forest inside Liechtenstein. The incident was said to have been resolved "over a case of white wine".
 In March 2007, a 170-man Swiss infantry unit got lost during a training exercise and inadvertently crossed  into Liechtenstein. The accidental invasion ended when the unit realized their mistake and turned back. The Swiss Army later informed Liechtenstein of the incursion and offered official apologies, to which an internal ministry spokesperson responded, "No problem, these things happen."
 On 20 September 2017, Liechtenstein signed the United Nations Treaty on the Prohibition of Nuclear Weapons.

See also 
Outline of Liechtenstein

References

External links 

  (in German and English)
 Princely House of Liechtenstein
 Parliament of Liechtenstein
 Government of Liechtenstein
 Official tourism of Liechtenstein
 Statistics Office of Liechtenstein 
 Liechtenstein. The World Factbook. Central Intelligence Agency.
 Liechtenstein from UCB Libraries GovPubs
 
 Liechtenstein profile from BBC News
 
 
 

 
1719 establishments in the Holy Roman Empire
Central European countries
Christian states
Countries in Europe
German-speaking countries and territories
Landlocked countries
Member states of the Council of Europe
Member states of the European Free Trade Association
Member states of the United Nations
NUTS 1 statistical regions of the European Union
NUTS 2 statistical regions of the European Union
NUTS 3 statistical regions of the European Union
Principalities of the Holy Roman Empire
Principalities
States and territories established in 1866
States of the Confederation of the Rhine
States of the German Confederation
Tax avoidance
Western European countries